Minka Yady Camara (born 15 October 1989) is a Guinean professional footballer who plays for Aviron Bayonnais.

Club career
Camara was born in Conakry, Guinea. He began his career with Fello Star Labé before signing for Le Mans UC72 in summer 2007. After three years with Le Mans in France's Ligue 1 he left the club in summer 2009 to sign for SO Cholet.

International career
He is also a member of the Guinea national football team.

References

External links
 

1989 births
Living people
Sportspeople from Conakry
Association football midfielders
Guinean footballers
Guinea international footballers
Championnat National 2 players
Championnat National 3 players
Le Mans FC players
SO Cholet players
Vendée Poiré-sur-Vie Football players
Jura Sud Foot players
Tarbes Pyrénées Football players
Stade Montois (football) players
Aviron Bayonnais FC players
Guinean expatriate footballers